Kerrie Taylor (born 1973) is a British actress from Romsey, Hampshire.

Career 
Taylor is best known for the role of Beth Enright/Beresford on the ITV family drama Where the Heart Is, a role she played for four years, leaving in 2005.

She is also well known for her five-year role as Lucy Benson in the soap opera Hollyoaks, from the series start in October 1995 to January 2000. Other acting credits include Crossroads, Heartbeat, Clocking Off, Fallen, Casualty and most recently a role in BBC daytime serial drama Doctors.
She also presents for the fashion brand Annalee+Hope on Sky digital shopping channel QVC.

Education
Kerrie Taylor studied drama at Manchester Metropolitan University's School of Theatre.

Personal life
She is married to journalist Jason Farrell.

References

External links

Alumni of Manchester Metropolitan University
English television actresses
Living people
People from Romsey
1973 births